This is a partial list of canyons and gorges in Turkey.

References

Canyons
Canyons and gorges of Turkey